Mucronea is a genus of plants in the family Polygonaceae with two species restricted to California. Known generally as spineflowers, they are closely related to genus Chorizanthe. They are annual herbs producing slender, erect, glandular stems from taproots. The leaves are located in a rosette around the base of the stem and wither quickly. The inflorescence is an open array of flowers, each blooming in an involucre of spiny bracts lined with awn-tipped teeth. The six-lobed flowers are white to pink.

Species 

 Mucronea californica  – California spineflower
 Mucronea perfoliata  – Perfoliate spineflower

References

External links 
 
 Jepson Manual Treatment
 USDA Plants Profile

Polygonaceae genera
Flora of California
Polygonaceae